The North Charlotte Historic District is a  national historic district located in Charlotte, Mecklenburg County, North Carolina.  The listing included 282 contributing buildings and four contributing structures.   It includes work designed by architect Stuart Warren Cramer;  it includes Bungalow/craftsman, Late Victorian, vernacular Victorian, reflecting turn-of-the-century mill-village architecture.  Located in the district is the separately listed Highland Park Mill No. 3.  Other notable buildings include the Mecklenburg Mill (later Mercury Mills, 1905), Johnston Mill (1913), Grinnell Manufacturing Company, Hand Pharmacy Building (1904), Lowder Building (1927), the former Highland Inn (c. 1903), Charlotte Fire Department Engine Company No. 9 (1937), and North Charlotte Primary School.

It was listed on the National Register of Historic Places in 1990.

References 

Historic districts on the National Register of Historic Places in North Carolina
Victorian architecture in North Carolina
Geography of Charlotte, North Carolina
Buildings and structures in Charlotte, North Carolina
National Register of Historic Places in Mecklenburg County, North Carolina